Ugwu Lotachukwu Jacinta Obianuju Amelia is a Nigerian actress popularly known as Lota Chukwu. She gained popularity after starring in popular Nigerian TV series, Jenifa's Diary, alongside Funke Akindele, Juliana Olayode, and Falz where she plays the role of "Kiki", a friend of the lead character, Jenifa. She is also a yoga fitness enthusiast.

Early life 
Lota was born in Nsukka, Enugu State, Nigeria but she had her childhood upbringing mostly in Benin City. Lota is the last of four children of her parents. She studied Agricultural Economics and Extension Service at the University of Benin and subsequently acted at the Royal Arts Academy in Lagos, Nigeria.

Career 
Before acting, Lota was a model and participated in the 2011 edition of The Most Beautiful Girl in Nigeria representing Yobe State. She started her acting in 2011, but became popular after appearing on Jenifa's Dairy, playing the role of Kiki. She has also starred in movies like The Royal Hibiscus Hotel, Falling, Fine Girl, The Arbitration, Dognapped.

Lota was featured as the lead character in Reminisce's Ponmile video, as well as Aramide's Why So Serious video. She was also on set in the movie The Inkblot.

Lota Takes 
In 2017, she announced the take off of her food show "Lota Takes", a cooking and lifestyle show which shows Lota in her elements as a food and nature lover. The show has featured several Nigerian celebrities including Adekunle Gold, Tosin Ajibade, Aramide (musician) MC Galaxy

Filmography

Music videos

TV shows

Movies

Awards and nominations

References

External links 

1989 births
Actresses from Lagos State
Igbo actresses
Living people
21st-century Nigerian actresses
Nigerian film actresses
Nigerian television actresses
Participants in Nigerian reality television series
Actresses from Enugu State
University of Benin (Nigeria) alumni
Nigerian female models
Most Beautiful Girl in Nigeria contestants
Nigerian beauty pageant contestants
Nigerian writers